The Spirit of the USA is a 1924 American silent drama film directed by Emory Johnson and written by Emilie Johnson. The film stars Johnnie Walker and Mary Carr. The film was released on May 18, 1924 by FBO.



Plot
Emilie Johnson claimed Woodrow Wilson inspired this story. This film takes place during World War I.

Thomas Gains Carl Stockdale and his wife, Mary Mary Carr, play a couple living on a farm with their two sons.  Her oldest son is Johnnie, played by Johnnie Walker.  Her youngest son is named Silas, played by Cuyler Supplee.

In April 1917, the U.S. joined the allies, declares war against Germany, and enters World War I. Overwhelmed with a sense of duty, Johnnie immediately wants to enlist in the Army.  He is rejected.  He then enlists in the Salvation Army and is shipped to Europe. His lazy, cowardly brother shrugs his duty, takes over the farm, and marries Zelda Burrows, played by Rosemary Cooper. Zelda's father, John Burrows, played by Mark Fenton, wants to acquire the Gains farm to build a dam – legally or otherwise.

Zelda teases Silas for staying home during the war.  Showing Zelda, he's not a coward, Silas enlists in the Army. Silas is shipped to France and dies on the battlefield.  Learning of her husband's death, Zelda takes control of the farm. Her father's lawyer, Jim Fuller, played by Dave Kirby, claims  Johnnie has also been killed in Europe.  Zelda promptly evicts Thomas and Mary from their home.  Then Zelda claims the farm along with her father.  Her father starts to build his dam.

Suddenly, Johnnie returns home.  Everyone thought he had died in battle.  After his return, he starts to restore order. Johnnie tosses Zelda off the farm, blows up the dam, and restores his parents' property. Then Johnnie finds out his sweetheart – Gretchen played by Gloria Grey has been waiting for him. Johnnie marries Gretchen, and they live happily ever after.

Cast

{| 
! style="width: 150px; text-align: left;" | Actor
! style="width: 190px; text-align: left;" | Role
|- style="text-align: left;"
|Johnnie Walker || Johnnie Gains
|-
|Mary Carr || Mary Gains
|-
|Carl Stockdale || Thomas Gains
|-
|Mark Fenton || John J. Burrows
|-
|William S. Hooser || Otto Schultz
|-
|Gloria Grey || Gretchen Schultz
|-
|Rosemary Cooper || Zelda Burrows
|-
|David Kirby || Jim Fuller
|-
|Cuyler Supplee || Silas Gains
|-
|Dick Brandon || Little Johnnie Gains
|-
|Newton House || Little Silas Gains
|-
|Richard Morris || Grandpa Gains
|-
|}

Production
The original name of the photoplay was Swords and Plowshares.

Emory Johnson and the cast spent several weeks shooting the movie in the vicinity of the Presidio, San Francisco.

The action scenes were filmed near Hollywood.  Emory selected an area where the terrain mimicked the European battlegrounds of  World War I. To make the battle scenes more realistic, Emory used High Explosives, fake Gas Shells, and mines. Many residents began to think the  Japanese had started to invade California.

The area where the battle scenes were filmed was left so pock-marked, considerable effort was needed to make the land usable again.

Preservation Status
A report created by film historian and archivist David Pierce for the Library of Congress claims:
75% of original silent-era films have perished.
14% of the 10,919 silent films released by major studios exist in their original 35mm or other formats.
11% survive in full-length foreign versions or on film formats of lesser image quality. Many silent-era films did not survive for reasons as explained on this Wikipedia page.

Emory Johnson directed 13 films - 11 were silent, and 2 were Talkies. The Spirit of the USA was the fifth film in Emory Johnson's eight-picture contract with FBO. The film's length is listed at 9 reels. According to the Library of Congress website, this film has a status of - Completeness: abridgment and No holdings located in archives.

A 15-minute excerpt is available on the Internet Archive
The film segment is available on YouTube and from various DVD vendors

Gallery

References

External links

1924 adventure films
1920s romance films
1924 films
1924 drama films
American action adventure films
American adventure films
American black-and-white films
American romance films
American romantic drama films
American silent feature films
Film Booking Offices of America films
Lost American films
Melodrama films
Films directed by Emory Johnson
1920s English-language films
1920s American films
Silent romantic drama films
Silent adventure films
Silent American drama films